Empress Hotel may refer to:

 Empress Hotel, Fitzroy North, Melbourne
 Empress Hotel (Toronto), destroyed by fire
 The Empress (hotel), Victoria, British Columbia
 The Empress Hotel (New Jersey), in Asbury Park